Alain Lance (born in Bonsecours, 18 December 1939) is a French writer and translator.

He has been acknowledged for his translations of German authors into French: Volker Braun, Franz Fühmann, Ingo Schulze and Christa Wolf. He lives in Paris.

Awards
 Prix Guillaume Apollinaire (2001)
 Eugen-Helmlé-Übersetzerpreis (2012)

References

External links
 Radiointerview von Günter Liehr mit Lance auf der Seite des französischen Auslandssenders RFI, 2003

1939 births
People from Seine-Maritime
French translators
Translators from German
Translators to French
Living people
French male non-fiction writers